Amirabad-e Karbalayi Khosrow (also Romanized as Amīrābād-e Karbalāyī Khosrow; also known as Amīrābād) is a village in Khonjesht Rural District, in the Central District of Eqlid County, Fars Province, Iran. At the 2006 census, its population was 47, in 14 families.

References 

Populated places in Eqlid County